Thossawat Limwannasathian (born May 17, 1993) is a Thai professional footballer who plays as a midfielder for Thai League 1 club Bangkok United and the Thailand national team.

International career
In June 2015, Thossawat debuted for Thailand against Bahrain in a friendly match. In 2016 Thossawat was selected in Thailand U23 squad for 2016 AFC U-23 Championship in Qatar.

International

International goals

Under-23

Honours

Club
Muangthong United
 Thai League Cup (1): 2017
 Mekong Club Championship (1): 2017

International
Thailand
 King's Cup (1): 2016

References

External links
 

Living people
1993 births
Thossawat Limwannasathian
Thossawat Limwannasathian
Association football midfielders
Thossawat Limwannasathian
Thossawat Limwannasathian
Thossawat Limwannasathian
Thossawat Limwannasathian
Thossawat Limwannasathian
Thossawat Limwannasathian
Thossawat Limwannasathian